Litia Botei Tikoisuva is a Fijian international female lawn bowler.

Biography
Tikoisuva won a pairs bronze medal with Radhika Prasad at the 1996 World Outdoor Bowls Championship in  Victoria Park in Royal Leamington Spa, England.

She has won five medals at the Asia Pacific Bowls Championships including the women's singles gold medal at the 2005 Championships in Melbourne.

In 2019, she won a gold medal at the Pacific Games in the singles event and in 2020, she was selected for the 2020 World Outdoor Bowls Championship in Australia. In 2022, she competed in the women's singles and the women's pairs at the 2022 Commonwealth Games.

References

Living people
1963 births
Fijian female bowls players
Bowls players at the 2022 Commonwealth Games